
Year 226 BC was a year of the pre-Julian Roman calendar. At the time it was known as the Year of the Consulship of Messalla and Fullo (or, less frequently, year 528 Ab urbe condita). The denomination 226 BC for this year has been used since the early medieval period, when the Anno Domini calendar era became the prevalent method in Europe for naming years.

Events 
 By place 
 Greece 
 An earthquake destroys the city of Kameiros and the Colossus of Rhodes on the island of Rhodes.
 The Spartan King Cleomenes III captures Mantineia and defeats the Achaean League under Aratus of Sicyon at Hecatombaeum, near Dyme in north-eastern Elis.

 Roman Republic 
 A formidable host of Gauls, some of them from across the Alps, threaten Rome.
 The Greek merchants of Massilia, frightened by Carthaginian successes in Spain (including their exploitation of the Spanish silver mines), appeal to Rome. Rome makes an alliance with the independent Spanish port city of Saguntum south of the Ebro River.
 The Romans send an embassy to Hasdrubal and conclude a treaty which prohibits him from waging war north of the river Ebro, but allowing him a free hand to the south even at the expense of the interests of the town of Massilia.

 Seleucid Empire 
 Antiochus Hierax, brother of the Seleucid King Seleucus II manages to escape from captivity in Thrace and flees to the mountains to raise an army, but he is killed by a band of Galatians.
 Seleucus II dies after a fall from his horse and is succeeded by his eldest son Seleucus III Soter. At the time of Seleucus II's death, the empire of the Seleucids, with its capital at Antioch on the Orontes, stretches from the Aegean Sea to the borders of India and includes southern Anatolia, Mesopotamia, Persia, and northern Syria. Dynastic power is upheld by a mercenary army and by the loyalty of many Greek cities founded by Alexander the Great and his successors. The strength of the empire is already being sapped by repeated revolts in its eastern provinces and dissention amongst the members of the Seleucid dynasty.

 China 
 The Qin generals Wang Jian, Li Xin and Wang Ben conquer western Yan and its capital Ji. To secure peace, king Xi of Yan executes his son Crown Prince Dan, who is wanted for the attempted assassination of the king of Qin, Ying Zheng.
Lord Changping defects from the State of Qin and returns to his motherland in Chu.

Births

Deaths 
 Antiochus Hierax, younger brother of Seleucus II, who has fought with him over the control of the Seleucid dominions in the Middle East (b. c. 263 BC)
 Lydiadas of Megalopolis
 Seleucus II Callinicus, king of the Seleucid kingdom from 246 BC

References